Zygaspis dolichomenta is a worm lizard species in the family Amphisbaenidae. It is endemic to the Democratic Republic of the Congo.

References

Zygaspis
Reptiles of the Democratic Republic of the Congo
Endemic fauna of the Democratic Republic of the Congo
Taxa named by Gaston-François de Witte
Taxa named by Raymond Laurent
Reptiles described in 1942